Abilene is a song written by Bob Gibson, Lester Brown and John D. Loudermilk, and recorded by American country music artist George Hamilton IV. The song reached number one on the U.S. country music chart for four weeks, and peaked at number 15 on the pop music charts. George Hamilton IV performed "Abilene" in the 1963 movie Hootenanny Hoot.

Background and writing
Bob Gibson was inspired to write the song after watching the Randolph Scott film Abilene Town.  The setting for the film is Abilene, Kansas, the railhead town at the end of the Chisholm Trail. Gibson said the song had often been erroneously thought to be about Abilene, Texas, named for the Kansas cowtown that had been established 24 years earlier but a much larger city.

Chart performance

Later versions
"Abilene" was recorded by Sonny James fourteen years later in 1977.  His version became a hit on the Country charts, reaching No. 24 in the U.S. and No. 16 (for two weeks) in Canada.
In 1999, The Mudballs included the song on their C. Of Love album. Bobby Bare recorded a version of the song for his 1963 album, 500 Miles Away from Home.

References

External links 
 

1963 singles
George Hamilton IV songs
Willie Nelson songs
Songs written by John D. Loudermilk
Songs about Texas
Songs about cities
1963 songs
RCA Records singles
Sonny James songs